Marisa Dal Santo (born August 3, 1987) is a regular-footed American former professional skateboarder and e-commerce clothing retailer from La Grange, Illinois.

Skateboarding career 
Dal Santo is recognized as a trailblazer in women's street skateboarding.

Zero 
Marisa Dal Santo turned down an offer to go pro for Zero. In 2009, Dal Santo had a full part in Zero skateboard’s Strange World. In 2010, Dal Santo quit Zero. In 2017, Dal Santo was given a guest pro model on Zero in honor of the 20th anniversary of the company.

References

External links 
 Best of Marisa Dal Santo - Thrasher
 Marisa Dal Santo - Zero Strange World HD
 GenXtravaganza - Dal Santo's online store

American skateboarders
Female skateboarders
1987 births
Living people